Ninja Theory Limited is a first-party British video game development studio based in Cambridge, England. Notable games it has developed include Kung Fu Chaos, Heavenly Sword, Enslaved: Odyssey to the West, DmC: Devil May Cry and Hellblade: Senua's Sacrifice.

Founded by Tameem Antoniades, Nina Kristensen and Mike Ball in March 2000, the company operated under the name Just Add Monsters. It was acquired by Argonaut Games soon after its founding and released Kung Fu Chaos for the original Xbox console. The company purchased itself from administrators after Argonaut Games was liquidated but suffered from financial troubles. Sony Computer Entertainment saved the team from bankruptcy by funding the development of Heavenly Sword, which was an expensive project. The game's poor sales resulted in Ninja Theory losing all their in-house technologies because of contractual agreements with Sony. The team then moved on to develop Enslaved: Odyssey to the West, an underperforming project in collaboration with writer Alex Garland, and DmC: Devil May Cry, a well-received title whose design was highly controversial, resulting in the team receiving death threats.

The team began diversifying its portfolio of games and taking on contract work for publishers after finishing the development of DmC. It also entrusted a small team to develop their first self-published title, Hellblade: Senua's Sacrifice. The team developed a business model they called "Independent AAA", where the game would have a small budget while retaining high production values. Exploring the theme of psychosis, the game was a commercial and critical success. In June 2018, it was officially announced that Ninja Theory had entered into an agreement to be acquired by Microsoft and became part of Microsoft Studios (now known as Xbox Game Studios). Several new projects, including virtual reality games, are under development.

History

Just Add Monsters (2000–2004)

At the time, the company had three staff but no money, equipment, or technology. Antoniades had ideas for a kung fu game and brainstormed them for a hack and slash multiplayer game called Kung Fu Chaos in his bedroom. As the team settled on the idea, they began actively looking for investment from major video game publishers, but none of them showed any interest in funding the game. Instead, they offered to buy the small company. As the team began to run out of money, they agreed to be acquired by Argonaut Games in September 2000.

With Argonaut's support and funding, the team was able to move into a proper office, hire 17 more staff and buy the technologies needed to make a video game. The development team assembled a gameplay demo of Kung Fu Chaos and presented it to Microsoft Games Studios. They were willing to provide funding for the game's development in order to have a strong line-up for their then-upcoming console, the Xbox. The publishing team at Microsoft was described as "helpful", assisting the team in refining the game during its production. Yet Microsoft failed to market the game properly. For example, no advertisements were prepared for the launch. While the game was critically praised, Kung Fu Chaos sales were hugely disappointing, and the game was a financial failure for the firm. At the time, Antoniades was disappointed and shocked that Microsoft would "send [the game] out to die," but understood Microsoft's decision to put their resources into other more profitable projects.

Before the release of Kung Fu Chaos, the team were already actively developing a sequel titled Kung Fu Chaos 2. The team used feedback from Kung Fu Chaos players to make the sequel a more mature game. While the team expected the publishing relationship with Microsoft would continue, they declined to fund the sequel since the first game was not warmly welcomed by its audience. As Microsoft retained the intellectual property (IP) rights to Kung Fu Chaos, and the team did not have sufficient resources to start from scratch, and could not use the Xbox codes they had programmed, the company ceased development of Kung Fu Chaos 2. Instead, they began working on a new IP, Kung Fu Story, which was also themed around kung fu and Chinese martial arts.

While developing Kung Fu Story, the team closely monitored the games market and realised that both the audience and publishers wanted games based on realism with high production values rather than those that have highly stylised visuals. Recognizing that Kung Fu Story would not fare well with the audience, the team decided to greatly expand the game's scope to satisfy players' demands. The team renamed the game Heavenly Sword, and assembled a demo using personal computers in an effort to guess the possible capabilities of the unannounced seventh generation of video game consoles. Publishers were interested in funding the game, but they were reluctant to do so due to Argonaut's financial troubles, of which the team at Just Add Monsters was unaware. In October 2004, Argonaut entered administration. The team remortgaged their apartments and Argonaut's CEO, Jez San provided investment to help the team to buy Just Add Monsters from the administrators. In November 2004, the team reestablished themselves as Ninja Theory, and the development of Heavenly Sword continued. Kristensen became the head of development, Antoniades led the design department, while Ball became the leader of the technology team. San joined as a member of the firm's board of directors.

Heavenly Sword, Enslaved and DmC (2004–2013)
After the company was reestablished, it had very limited capital and could only sustain its operations for three months. At the time, the company employed more than 50 people. The team continued to present Heavenly Sword to various publishers, but their responses were  unenthusiastic. Publishers questioned the team's ability to make a technology-intensive game because of their relatively small size. With few options remaining, the team signed a deal with Sony Computer Entertainment in May 2005. This saved the company from bankruptcy at the cost of IP and technology rights. The title would now become a PlayStation 3 exclusive. According to Antoniades, negotiating the deal with Sony was "soul-destroyingly difficult".

Fueled by the ambition to be "a top studio in the world", Ninja Theory had lofty goals for Heavenly Sword. With an estimated budget of $10 million to $20 million, Ninja Theory had a plan to develop the title into a multimedia franchise, ranging from a PlayStation Portable version to a film based on the game's story. The team also invested a lot in performance capture, working with Weta Digital and Andy Serkis, who became the title's "dramatic director". The company employed more than 100 people to work on the game, which took four-and-a-half years to develop. Sony actively interfered with the game's development, diminishing the team's creative freedom. It pressured them to produce a game that "fit in more with what a standard action-adventure video game should be". Many features were removed from the game during the final production stages to meet project deadlines. The game received generally positive reviews from critics when it was released in September 2007, and subsequently gained a cult following. However, sales did not meet expectations, and the title did not break even.

Ninja Theory then began working on a sequel, but they had employed so many people to work on the title it did not fit with the "cost-analysis model of AAA production". Once the team engaged in the development of the sequel, it would become their only project; the company could not seek other opportunities. Not wanting to dissolve the entire team to work on the sequel, Ninja Theory decided to leave Heavenly Sword and all the technologies built for it to Sony and seek external funding from another publisher for their next project. According to Antoniades, it was a "heart-breaking moment".

While researching Heavenly Swords wuxia theme Antoniades read Journey to the West, which inspired the company's next game, Enslaved: Odyssey to the West. However, the team wanted to try something new, thus many of the fantasy and wuxia elements were shifted to sci-fi. Without their own technology, the team used Epic Games' Unreal Engine. Because Heavenly Sword had been unprofitable, Ninja Theory needed to present the new game to publishers as fast as possible since they did not have much reserve cash. Initially, they signed a deal with Green Screen, which dissolved a month later. Namco Bandai Games agreed to publish the game. Using only two-thirds of the budget of Heavenly Sword, the team hired Alex Garland to write the game's story. Antoniades found Garland "intimidating" to work with, though Garland found the team "friendly". Garland often argued with Antoniades over the inclusion of boss fights, and became involved with the game's design. Andy Serkis returned to do motion capture, and Nitin Sawhney, composer for Heavenly Sword, returned to write Enslaveds music.

Enslaved was positively reviewed by critics when it was released in October 2010. However, like previous Ninja Theory projects, the market responded unenthusiastically, and it was a commercial failure. While Ninja Theory developed a piece of single-player downloadable content (DLC), titled Pigsy's Perfect 10, the multiplayer DLC that was in development was cancelled after the lukewarm reception.
Immediately after the completion of Enslaved: Odyssey to the West, publisher Capcom chose Ninja Theory to develop the next entry in the Devil May Cry series, as it was impressed by the company's past work, especially on Heavenly Sword. Capcom intentionally selected a western developer so that they could "add western flair to a traditionally Japanese-styled game", and granted the company plenty of creative freedom. Hideaki Itsuno supervised the entire project. The team came up with a new design for series' protagonist Dante, which generated backlash and some criticism. Some fans sent Ninja Theory death threats, of which some were sent in the form of comics and death metal songs. Antoniades responded to fan displeasure over the redesign by saying that "The essence of Devil May Cry  is all about 'cool'" and that the design from the PS2 era "isn't cool anymore." Despite being a controversial project, DmC: Devil May Cry received critical acclaim when it was released in January 2013. It was a commercial success for Ninja Theory. The title reached the top of the United Kingdom, United States, European and Japanese retail software sales charts. For the first time, the team received royalties from a project. Heavenly Sword, Enslaved: Odyssey to the West and DmC: Devil May Cry collectively sold approximately 4.5 million units.

Independent AAA (2013–2018)
With the introduction of the eighth generation of video game consoles, Ninja Theory predicted there would be a rise in development costs, and publishers would become even more conservative when funding projects. As a result, the team decided to diversify its portfolio of games and split into smaller teams, working on various projects. The company collaborated with Chillingo to release a free-to-play mobile game named Fightback. According to Antoniades, Fightback was a learning experience for the studio as they explored the "games as a service" models, mobile technology, touch screen controls and realised the competitive nature of the mobile games market.

The company began experimenting with smaller titles, unsuccessfully pitching them to publishers. They pitched a horror game to Garland. Publishers asked for the addition of melee combat and then informed the team that neither horror nor melee combat was popular in the games market. Ninja Theory and Garland pitched another four-player cooperative gameplay experience set in the real world featuring real characters, but publishers insisted that sci-fi or fantasy elements be added to it so the game would sell. The company also experimented with a multiplayer-based melee-combat game. Publishers were reluctant to fund it as the project did not have a single-player component, the team was inexperienced and an action melee game was unlikely to be profitable.

In early 2013, the company tried to develop a game that suited publishers' requirements, while also remaining creative. The project, known as Razor, is a multiplayer game that mixes gunplay and melee combat. It features an extensive story and a boss that would have thousands of players fighting for months. It also has mobile control integration and missions that are procedurally generated. Publishers were initially keen on signing the project, but a game of a similar nature, Destiny from Bungie was announced, and most publishers opted not to compete with it directly. The team then partnered with a publisher to develop a project based on the Razor assets, but both sides terminated their agreement as the publisher interfered with Ninja Theory's creative freedom. The company partnered with Disney Interactive from 2014–2015, providing additional development and combat elements for Disney Infinity: Marvel Super Heroes and Disney Infinity 3.0. This helped sustain the company's operations.

The failure of Razor, and questions from Garland about why the gaming development scene did not have many independent projects similar to the independent film industry prompted the team to begin to evaluate the idea of "independent AAA", where the team would own the intellectual property and publish the game themselves without mainstream game publishers. The game would still have high production values but would be sold at a lower price. The team firmly believed that there was "a middle ground between the low budget pure indie development and AAA [projects]". The team opted not to use Kickstarter having decided to fund it themselves. This led to the creation of Hellblade: Senua's Sacrifice, which had a team of only 15 people working on it. Since the game had a small budget, the studio did not promote the game heavily with advertisements instead creating numerous developer diaries for players who were interested in it. The team collaborated with several technology companies like 3Lateral, Cubic Motion and Xsens to help with motion capture, which allowed the actors to preview their performance while acting. In September 2016, Ninja Theory announced their Senua Studio division, which would work on real-time virtual character technology. As the game explored mental illness and psychosis, the company consulted professional neuroscientists and obtained financial backing from the Wellcome Trust. After a three-year development cycle Hellblade was a critical success when it launched in August 2017, with praise for its depiction of mental illnesses. The game was also a commercial success, becoming profitable within three months of its release, generating more than $13 million with sales of more than 500,000 units. The game was nominated for nine awards and won five at the 14th British Academy Games Awards. Antoniades considered the critical acclaim validation that the independent AAA business model worked.

The company has several titles in development, both traditional and virtual reality projects. As for the future, Antoniades shared: "We've got other projects on the go, led by different team members who have their own personal slant on what they want to do, and they're not serious subjects, they are much more fun, traditional games if you like."

Acquisition by Microsoft (2018–present)
On 10 June 2018, during E3 2018, Microsoft announced that they had entered into an agreement to acquire Ninja Theory alongside three other studios as part of Microsoft Studios. Studio creative director Tameem Antoniades said that they opted for the acquisition as "We want to be free from the AAA machine and make games focused on the experience, not around monetization", and would allow them to continue building smaller, risky games with creative independence. For Microsoft, Ninja Theory was seen as a studio that would produce good content that fits with the Xbox Game Pass subscription service, according to head of Microsoft Studios Matt Booty.

In October 2019, Ninja Theory announced the establishment of a research and development effort dealing with mental health, dubbed The Insight Project. The Insight Project builds upon and continues the co-operation between Ninja Theory and Paul Fletcher, a University of Cambridge psychiatrist and professor of health neuroscience who had consulted the studio on Hellblade. With The Insight Project, Ninja Theory plans to build smaller games to "help people identify and control negative emotions". At The Game Awards 2019, Ninja Theory announced Senua's Saga: Hellblade II for Xbox Series X.

The studio teased a new experimental game, Project: Mara in January 2020. Antoniades said that Project: Mara "will be a real-world and grounded representation of true mental terror" and "will be based heavily on research, interviews, and firsthand accounts to recreate the horrors of the mind as accurately and believably as possible."

Games developed

Notes

References

External links
 

2000 establishments in England
2018 mergers and acquisitions
British companies established in 2000
British subsidiaries of foreign companies
Companies based in Cambridge
First-party video game developers
Microsoft subsidiaries
Video game companies established in 2000
Video game companies of the United Kingdom
Video game development companies
Xbox Game Studios